Narak (also Romanized as Nārak) is a village in Nujin Rural District, in the Central District of Farashband County, Fars Province, Iran. At the 2006 census, its population was 195, in 53 families.

References 

Populated places in Farashband County